Abu Abdullah (also transliterated as Abdallah) meaning father of Abdullah, is a given name and a common alias used by several people, it may refer to:

Given name
 Abu-Abdullah Adelabu, Nigerian academic
 Abu Abdallah Mohammed Amghar, Moroccan Sufi
 Abu Abdullah ibn Battuta (born 1304), Moroccan scholar and explorer
 Abu Abdullah al-Rashid al-Baghdadi (1959-2010), Iraqi Islamist
 Abu Abdullah al-Shafi'i, Iraqi Islamist
 Abu 'Abdullah al-Shi'i, Yemeni Islamic figure

Alias
 Muhammad XII of Granada, the last Moorish King of Granada
 Sami Al-Arian, Kuwaiti activist
 Osama bin Laden (1957–2011), Saudi deceased leader of al-Qaeda, and mastermind behind 9/11
 Marwan al-Shehhi (1978–2001), Emirati hijacker-pilot of United Airlines Flight 175
 Ayman al-Zawahiri, Egyptian al-Qaeda leader

Surname
 Mohamed Abu Abdullah, Bangladeshi athlete

Arabic masculine given names